The South Henderson Church is a historic Presbyterian church located in rural Henderson County, Illinois, east of the village of Gladstone. The church was built in 1854; it was the second church building used by the local Associate Reformed Presbyterian congregation, which formed in 1835 and built its first church two years later. The vernacular building has a wood frame plan and limestone walls and used local materials in its construction, which cost $3,855.55. Reverend Robert Ross led the congregation when it built the 1854 church; Ross was one of the founders of Monmouth College and served on its first Board of Trustees.

The congregation's cemetery is located east of the church; an unpaved road separates the church and cemetery. An iron fence dated 1920 surrounds the cemetery. The gravestones in the cemetery are generally well-maintained, and some of the oldest ones mark the graves of Revolutionary War veterans.

South Henderson, now part of the United Presbyterian Church, disorganized in 1954, and the Old South Henderson Cemetery Association now cares for the site. The church and cemetery were added to the National Register of Historic Places on October 14, 1976.

References

External links
 

Churches on the National Register of Historic Places in Illinois
Churches completed in 1854
Buildings and structures in Henderson County, Illinois
Presbyterian churches in Illinois
Cemeteries on the National Register of Historic Places in Illinois
Associate Reformed Presbyterian Church
National Register of Historic Places in Henderson County, Illinois
1854 establishments in Illinois